"Fallen Angel" is a song by Canadian rock band Three Days Grace. The song was released on 15 September 2015, as the fourth and final single from the band's fifth studio album Human.

Background
In December 2015, Three Days Grace's drummer Neil Sanderson said "Fallen Angel" was about his mother's grief after the deaths of his brother and father when he was five years old.

Music video
An official lyric video for the single was released on 2 November 2015, directed by Matthew JC. The video begins with singer Matt Walst stating, "This song is about losing the people we love and wishing we could have been the ones to save them." Lyrics are overlaid atop the band's live performance at the Bomb Factory in Dallas, TX.

Legacy
In 2016, Sanderson said the band created a page on their official website entitled the "Fallen Angel Dedication Wall" where messages can be posted in memory of loved ones.

Charts

Weekly charts

Year-end charts

References

2015 singles
2015 songs
Three Days Grace songs
Songs written by Barry Stock
Songs written by Neil Sanderson
Songs written by Joey Moi
Songs written by Gavin Brown (musician)
Songs written by Ted Bruner
Song recordings produced by Gavin Brown (musician)
Songs about death